Zoran Perišić may refer to:
 Zoran Perišić (politician)
 Zoran Perisic (visual effects artist)